Bagher Babashah Ashtiani (23 February 1923 – 22 December 2015) was an Iranian prosecutor and a judge on the country's highest court before the Iranian Revolution. He was chief prosecutor in the cities of Zanjan and Karaj.

Biography
In the 1970s, Babashahi was nominated by the Minister of Justice Manuchehr Parto and approved by Mohammadreza Shah Pahlavi to represent the state in the Iranian Supreme Court and later served as special counsel to the Country's Supreme Court. After the revolution, his last position was to serve as the head of Ministry of Justice's Bureau of Liquidation and Bankruptcy Affairs. He also wrote a column on social and judicial affairs in the popular Khandaniha magazine under the Pen name Behi. He died in Los Angeles, California due to respiratory failure in 2015.

In his lifetime, Babashahi was close to many prominent figures associated with the National Front of Iran such as Jalali Naeeni and Assadollah Mobasheri (who became the first minister of justice in the Islamic Republic in Bazargan's interim government). Although Babashahi greatly admired Prime Minister Mohammad Mosaddegh, he had a profound respect for Reza Shah as the "Father of Modern Iran".

Gallery

References

1923 births
2015 deaths
20th-century Iranian judges
Iranian emigrants to the United States